Vishnupriya Devi  , was the daughter of Raj Pandit Sanatan Mishra and second wife of Chaitanya Mahaprabhu. She is believed to be the reincarnation of the Goddess Satyabhama, the third consort of Krishna.

Life
Vishnupriya was born to Sanatan Mishra of Nabadwip. After the death of Lakshmipriya from the effects of a snakebite Chaitanya Mahaprabhu's mother Saci Devi asked him to marry Vishnupriya.

Chaitanya Mahaprabhu's Sanyas
In 1509, at the age of 24, Chaitanya Mahaprabhu became a Sanyasi, left home and also Vishnupriya.

Her hidden greatness
She is the direct manifestation of 'Bhu' form Mahalaxmi (Satyabhama) to help Gauranga Mahaprabhu in distributing love  which is the most important wealth (premdhan). When she was in her wealthy mood she was Laxmipriya which have been transformed into Vishnupriya when she was in her love-devotion mood due to Mahaprabhu's will and thus named Vishnupriya that is beloved of Vishnu. Some texts say that in Sri Krsna lila she appeared as Satyabhama that is incarnation of her Bhu form, the daughter of King Satrajit. Satyabhama was married to Sri Krsna and was one of the principle queen of Sri Krsna. King Satrajit from Sri Krsna lila appeared in Sri Gaura lila as Sri Sanatan Mishra. Mother Satyabhama appeared in the house of Sanatan Mishra as his daughter – Sri Vishnupriya devi. She is the 'Bhu Shakti' – Earth potency. Sri Krsna in His Narayan form or Vishnu tattva form has His divine Shakti Radha (Mahalakshmiji) who herself manifested into three potencies – Sri laxmi (her divine valuables), Bhu laxmi (the Goddess of Earth in which she representes fertility and patience), and Nila laxmi (the Goddess of pastimes). Bhu is the energy that creates the cosmic manifestation (nicely explained in Sri Caitanya-Charitamrita Adi lila initial chapters). Bhu-sakti also assists in manifesting Sri Krsna’s pastimes in Vrindavan , the place of His pastimes as they are displayed on the Earth planet in this universe and innumerable other universes. The goddess of this Earth, Prithivi devi, is also included within this potency.

See also
Chaitanya Mahaprabhu

References

Source: 

Year of birth missing
Year of death missing
16th-century Indian women
16th-century Indian people